Łysów  is a village in the administrative district of Gmina Przesmyki, within Siedlce County, Masovian Voivodeship, in east-central Poland.

References

Villages in Siedlce County
Siedlce Governorate
Lublin Governorate
Lublin Voivodeship (1919–1939)